is a Japanese voice actress and singer from Saitama Prefecture who is signed to Amuse. After aspiring to become a voice actress while studying in elementary school, she participated in two voice acting auditions in 2014, winning one of them. Some of her roles include Otako in Please Tell Me! Galko-chan, Yume Nijino in Aikatsu Stars!, Gabriel White Tenma in Gabriel DropOut, Riko in Made in Abyss, Rizu Ogata in We Never Learn, Chuatury "Chuchu" Panlunch in Mobile Suit Gundam: The Witch from Mercury and Matsuri Kazamaki (female) in Ayakashi Triangle.

Biography
Tomita was born in Saitama Prefecture on November 15, 1999. She first became interested in voice acting while in elementary school, after watching the anime series Vampire Knight. She also became a fan of voice actor Mamoru Miyano during this time. During her high school days, she was a member of her school's manga research club. She was a finalist in the Ani-Tan voice acting audition held in 2014, and in the same year won the Grand Prix at the 2014 Voice Actor Artist Development Program Selection audition. She debuted as a voice actress in 2015, voicing a number of minor roles in the anime television series Himouto! Umaru-chan, including voicing the protagonist Taihei Doma during a flashback.

In 2016, she was cast as in her first major role as Otako in the anime television series Please Tell Me! Galko-chan, where she also performed the opening theme together with Azumi Waki and Minami Takahashi. She was also cast as the character Yume Nijino in the anime television series Aikatsu Stars!, where she narrated a commercial for the series. During the same year, she was also cast in the anime film Garo: Divine Flame as Roberto Lewis. In 2017, she was cast as Gabriel White Tenma in the anime television series Gabriel DropOut. Together with co-stars Saori Ōnishi, Naomi Ōzora, and Kana Hanazawa, she performed the opening theme "Gabriel Dropkick" and ending theme "Hallelujah Essaim" She portrayed the role Kuina Natsugawa in the anime television series Hinako Note. She made her major debut as a singer under Nippon Columbia with the release of the single "Present Moment" on November 25, 2019; the title song is used as the opening theme to the anime series After School Dice Club. Her official fanclub, "+ you" (pronounced "plus you"), was launched on the same day as the launch of her first album, Prologue, on June 30, 2021.

Filmography

Anime
2015
 Is the Order a Rabbit?? as classmate A (episode 8)
 Himouto! Umaru-chan as Taihei Doma (young, episode 7), female student (episodes 3–4)

2016
 Please Tell Me! Galko-chan as Otako
 Aikatsu Stars! as Yume Nijino

2017
 Gabriel DropOut as Gabriel White Tenma
 Hinako Note as Kuina Natsukawa
 Made in Abyss as Riko
 Garo: Vanishing Line as Luke (child)

2018
 Overlord II as Tina
 Holmes of Kyoto as Aoi Mashiro
 Ms. Vampire Who Lives in My Neighborhood as Sophie Twilight

2019
 The Magnificent Kotobuki as Chika
 We Never Learn as Rizu Ogata
 Wasteful Days of High School Girls as Minami "Yamai" Yamamoto
 After School Dice Club as Midori Ono
 Aikatsu on Parade! as Yume Nijino
 Z/X Code reunion as Yuni Tsukigata

2020
Haikyū!! as Akane Yamamoto
Hatena Illusion as Yumemi Hoshisato
A Certain Scientific Railgun T as Mitori Kōzaku
Interspecies Reviewers as Crimvael
Dorohedoro as Ebisu
Tamayomi as Ibuki Kawaguchi
Kaguya-sama: Love Is War? as Miko Iino
Iwa-Kakeru! -Sport Climbing Girls- as Nonoka Sugiura
One Room Third Season as Akira Kotokawa
Kuma Kuma Kuma Bear as Shuri
Talentless Nana as Yūka Sasaki
Dogeza: I Tried Asking While Kowtowing as Kanan Misenai, Rei Shioya

2021
Otherside Picnic as Akari Seto
The Hidden Dungeon Only I Can Enter as Emma Brightness
Ex-Arm as Yggdrasil
Vivy: Fluorite Eye's Song as Momoka Kirishima
Combatants Will Be Dispatched! as Alice Kisaragi
Battle Athletes Victory ReSTART! as Shelley Wong

2022
Sabikui Bisco as Tirol Ōchagama
Miss Kuroitsu from the Monster Development Department as Melty
Shadowverse Flame as Tsubasa Takanashi
Skeleton Knight in Another World as Chiyome
In the Heart of Kunoichi Tsubaki as Tōwata
Kaguya-sama: Love Is War – Ultra Romantic as Miko Iino
Onipan! as Noriko Issun
The Rising of the Shield Hero 2 as Kizuna Kazayama
Made in Abyss: The Golden City of the Scorching Sun as Riko
My Stepmom's Daughter Is My Ex as Isana Higashira
Smile of the Arsnotoria the Animation as Little Alberta
Prima Doll as Gekka
Shine Post as Homare Torawatari
The Maid I Hired Recently Is Mysterious as Natsume Nakashima
Mobile Suit Gundam: The Witch from Mercury as Chuatury Panlunch
Shinobi no Ittoki as Satomi Tsubaki
Tabi Hani as Akari Yashima

2023
Farming Life in Another World as Flora
Endo and Kobayashi Live! The Latest on Tsundere Villainess Lieselotte as Fiene
Ayakashi Triangle as Matsuri Kazamaki (female)
KonoSuba: An Explosion on This Wonderful World! as Funifura
Too Cute Crisis as Sasara Azuma
The 100 Girlfriends Who Really, Really, Really, Really, Really Love You as Karane Inda

Films
2016
 Aikatsu Stars! as Yume Nijino
 Garo: Divine Flame as Roberto Lewis

2019
 Made in Abyss: Journey's Dawn as Riko
 Made in Abyss: Wandering Twilight as Riko
 KonoSuba: God's Blessing on this Wonderful World! Legend of Crimson as Funifura

2020
 Made in Abyss: Dawn of the Deep Soul as Riko
 High School Fleet: The Movie as Sachiho "Sunny" Chiba

2022
 Kaguya-sama: Love Is War – The First Kiss That Never Ends as Miko Iino

Video games
2016
Granblue Fantasy as Chloe

2018
Onsen Musume as Hinata Kinugawa
Shōjo Kageki Revue Starlight -Re LIVE- as Lalafin Nonomiya
Valkyrie Connect as Frigg

2020
Idolmaster Cinderella Girls: Starlight Stage as Akira Sunazuka
Arknights as Kafka

2021
Assault Lily Last Bullet as Himeka Sadamori
Smile of the Arsnotoria as Petit Albert
Azur Lane as USS New Jersey (BB-62)
Closers as Shizuku Hoshino (Eunha)

2022Fire Emblem Warriors: Three Hopes as Protagonist (Female) / Shez (Female)Genshin Impact as LaylaMade in Abyss: Binary Star Falling into Darkness as RikoSamurai Maiden as Komimi

2023Towa Tsugai as HachidoriFuga: Melodies of Steel 2 as Socks MillionEchocalypse as Lumin

Dubbing
 Apple of My Eye as Bailey Andrews
 The Returned'' as Victor

References

External links
  
  
 

1999 births
Living people
Amuse Inc. talents
Japanese women pop singers
Japanese video game actresses
Japanese voice actresses
Nippon Columbia artists
Voice actresses from Saitama Prefecture
21st-century Japanese actresses
21st-century Japanese women singers
21st-century Japanese singers